Roy Willard Rawlings (1883–1973) was an American politician in Rhode Island. A Republican, was a member of the Rhode Island House of Representatives from 1923 to 1934. He held the speakership from 1927 to 1933.

Rawlings was born on March 8, 1883, in Franklin, Illinois, to parents John H. Rawlings and Martha K. Seymour. He graduated DePauw University in 1908, and married Lucy I. Gammell later that year. The Rawlings family moved from Illinois to Rhode Island in 1913, a year after Rawlings and his wife had acquired the Lillibridge Plantation from Albert and Susie Watson. 
His son Rob Roy Rawlings and daughter Lucy Rawlings Tootell also served in government.

Rawlings, a Republican, was a member of the Rhode Island House of Representatives between 1923 and 1934, and served as speaker of the Rhode Island House from 1927 to 1933. He won the speakership when Democratic lawmakers crossed the floor to vote for him.

Rawlings was a stage actor and tax assessor before serving in the Rhode Island House. He lived in Richmond and later West Kingston.

References

1883 births
1973 deaths
DePauw University alumni
People from Morgan County, Illinois
Speakers of the Rhode Island House of Representatives
Republican Party members of the Rhode Island House of Representatives
20th-century American politicians
People from Richmond, Rhode Island
People from South Kingstown, Rhode Island